Cyclophora culicaria is a moth in the  family Geometridae. It is found in eastern North America, from Florida to Alabama and New Jersey.

The wingspan is about 15 mm. Adults have been recorded on wing from April to June and in August.

The larvae feed on Leiophyllum buxifolium.

References

Moths described in 1857
Cyclophora (moth)
Moths of North America